Parma Football Club only just survived a horror Serie A season for the club, in which the cash-strapped club went from Champions League contenders to relegation strugglers, only surviving thanks to a spareggio victory against Bologna. With lethal striker Alberto Gilardino leaving the club for Milan and goalkeeper Sébastien Frey for Fiorentina, the future looked bleak, especially given that several clubs had accumulated more than 40 points in the 2004–05 season. On a positive note, Parma reached the semi finals of the UEFA Cup, where it drew 0–0 to CSKA Moscow, before finally losing 3–0 in Russia.

First-team squad
Squad at end of season

Left club during season

Reserve team
The following players did not appear for the first team this season.

Results

Serie A

League table

Results summary

Results by round

Matches

Relegation play-offs

Coppa Italia

Round of 16

UEFA Cup

First round

Group stage

Final phase

Round of 32

Round of 16

Quarter-finals

Semi-finals

Statistics

Appearances and goals

|-
! colspan=14 style=background:#dcdcdc; text-align:center| Goalkeepers

|-
! colspan=14 style=background:#dcdcdc; text-align:center| Defenders

|-
! colspan=14 style=background:#dcdcdc; text-align:center| Midfielders

|-
! colspan=14 style=background:#dcdcdc; text-align:center| Forwards

Goalscorers

References

Parma Calcio 1913 seasons
Parma